Larissa Carvalho (born 9 March 1985) is a Brazilian former professional tennis player.

Biography
Carvalho, a right-handed player from Brasília, was a top-50 ranked junior.

From 2004 to 2007, Carvalho appeared in eleven Fed Cup ties for Brazil, winning four singles and five doubles rubbers.

Carvalho reached a best singles ranking of 240 on the professional tour and won five ITF titles. As a doubles player, she won a further seven ITF tournaments and made a WTA Tour main draw appearance at the 2007 Copa Colsanitas in Bogotá, partnering Jenifer Widjaja.

Her brother Raony Carvalho also played professionally.

ITF finals

Singles: 8 (5–3)

Doubles: 15 (7–8)

References

External links
 
 
 

1985 births
Living people
Brazilian female tennis players
Sportspeople from Brasília
South American Games medalists in tennis
South American Games gold medalists for Brazil
Competitors at the 2002 South American Games
20th-century Brazilian women
21st-century Brazilian women